Allen Raymond Trammell, Jr. (born July 19, 1942) is a former American football defensive back who played one season with the Houston Oilers of the American Football League. He played college football at the University of Florida. He first enrolled at Eufaula High School in Eufaula, Alabama before transferring to Baylor School in Chattanooga, Tennessee.

References

External links
Just Sports Stats
College stats

Living people
1942 births
Players of American football from Montgomery, Alabama
American football defensive backs
Florida Gators football players
Houston Oilers players
American Football League players